Raw Deal is a 1948 American  film noir crime film directed by Anthony Mann and starring Dennis O'Keefe, Claire Trevor and Marsha Hunt. It was shot by cinematographer John Alton with sets designed by the art director Edward L. Ilou. An independent production by Edward Small, it was distributed by Eagle-Lion Films.

Plot
Prison convict Joe Sullivan (Dennis O'Keefe) has "taken the fall" for an unspecified crime. His share for committing the crime was to be $50,000. Joe breaks out of jail with the help of his girl Pat (Claire Trevor). The escape has been facilitated by their former accomplice Rick Coyle (Raymond Burr), a sadistic mobster, who expects Joe to be killed during his escape and so avoid having to pay Joe his $50,000. When against all expectations the break-out succeeds, Rick decides that he must have Joe killed.

Pat and Joe's getaway car is damaged and Joe decides that they will hide out at his legal caseworker Ann's (Marsha Hunt) apartment. Ann had been visiting Joe in prison because she was trying to reform him and also because she was developing feelings for him. When the police close in on Ann's apartment she tries to convince Joe to give himself up. Instead Joe forces Ann to escape with him and Pat.  Pat sees the attraction between Joe and Ann and doesn't know what to do about it. Joe finds himself between two women who love him. The three of them continue to evade the police until  one of Rick's men finds them. Rick's man (John Ireland) and Joe get into a fight and Ann saves Joe by shooting Rick's man in the back. After acting in Joe's defense this way, Ann realizes how much she is in love with him. Out of loyalty to Pat, Joe sets Ann free and prepares to flee the country with Pat. In Joe and Pat's hotel room, Pat takes a phone call warning them that Rick has seized Ann and will harm her unless Joe and Pat come out of hiding. Pat does not want Joe to go back to Ann, so lies about the call, saying it was from the hotel desk clerk asking about their checkout time.

After boarding a ship, Joe attempts to convince Pat that they can start a new life in South America together. He even proposes marriage to her. A guilt-stricken Pat now confesses to Joe that Ann has been abducted by Rick. Joe races to save Ann from her captor. Under the cover of a thick fog, Joe manages to get past Rick's henchmen and sneaks into Rick's room. A gunfight erupts with Rick and Joe shooting each other and inadvertently starting a fire. Joe and Rick, both wounded, fight hand-to-hand with Joe finally pushing Rick through an upper story window to his death. Mortally wounded and lying in the street, Joe dies in Ann's arms as Pat looks on. Seeing the resigned contentment in Joe's face, Pat comments in voice-over that: "This is right for Joe. This is what he wanted."

Cast
 Dennis O'Keefe as Joe Sullivan
 Claire Trevor as Pat Regan
 Marsha Hunt as Ann Martin
 John Ireland as Fantail
 Raymond Burr as Rick Coyle
 Curt Conway as Spider
 Chili Williams as Marcy 
 Richard Fraser as Fields
 Whit Bissell as Murderer
 Cliff Clark as Gates
 Richard Irving as	Brock 
 Harry Tyler as 	Oscar 
 Ilka Grüning as Fran - Oscar's Housekeeper
 Tom Fadden as 	Grimshaw 
 Ray Teal as Police Commanding Officer
 Robert B. Williams as San Francisco Detective Sergeant 
 Carey Loftin as 	Motorcycle Cop
 Gregg Barton as 	Car Owner 
 Bill Kennedy as 	Drunk 
 Beverly Wills as 	Girl

Reception

Box-office
The film was a success at the box office and was profitable.

Critical reception
When the film was released, New York Times critic Bosley Crowther panned it. "But this, of course, is a movie—and a pretty low-grade one, at that—in which sensations of fright and excitement are more diligently pursued than common sense...Except for the usual moral—to wit, that crime does not pay—the only thing proved by this picture is that you shouldn't switch sweethearts in mid-lam."

In Girl and a Gun: The Complete Guide to Film Noir, David N. Meyer wrote: "It's the richest cinematography in noir outside of Orson Welles' Citizen Kane."

In popular culture
The title characters in Harlan Ellison's 1969 post-apocalyptic novella A Boy and His Dog watch Raw Deal, which is said to be 76 years old (setting the Ellison story in the year 2024).

References

External links

 
 
 
 
 

1948 films
1940s crime thriller films
American black-and-white films
American chase films
American crime thriller films
American prison films
Eagle-Lion Films films
1940s English-language films
Film noir
Films directed by Anthony Mann
Films produced by Edward Small
Films set in California
Films shot in California
Films scored by Paul Sawtell
1940s American films